Claudio Roberto Perdomo Interiano (born 20 March 1964) is a Honduran politician. He currently serves as deputy of the National Congress of Honduras representing the National Party of Honduras for Santa Bárbara.

References

1964 births
Living people
People from Santa Bárbara Department, Honduras
Deputies of the National Congress of Honduras
National Party of Honduras politicians